William Michael Tracey (4 November 1876 – 28 January 1945) was an English footballer who played in the Football League for Bolton Wanderers.

Personal life
Tracey served as a private in the King's Shropshire Light Infantry during the First World War.

References

1876 births
1945 deaths
English footballers
Association football forwards
English Football League players
Shrewsbury Town F.C. players
Bolton Wanderers F.C. players
Chirk AAA F.C. players
British Army personnel of World War I
King's Shropshire Light Infantry soldiers
Sportspeople from Shrewsbury
Footballers from Shropshire
Military personnel from Shrewsbury